Gaynier may refer to:

Oswald J. Gaynier (1915-1942), a United States Navy officer and Navy Cross recipient
USS Gaynier (DE-751), a United States Navy destroyer escort cancelled in 1944